Cerro Castillo Airport ,  is an airstrip serving the village and border station at Cerro Castillo, in the Magallanes Region of Chile.

Runway 26 has an additional  of unpaved overrun on the west end.

See also

Transport in Chile
List of airports in Chile

References

External links
OpenStreetMap - Cerro Castillo
OurAirports - Cerro Castillo
FallingRain - Cerro Castillo Airport

Airports in Magallanes Region